Audrey Lacroix (born November 17, 1983) is a retired  Canadian competitive swimmer from Montreal, Quebec.  She is the Canadian record-holder in the 200-metre butterfly (short-course and long-course).  She is a former world record-holder in the short-course 4x100-metre medley relay along with teammates Katy Murdoch, Annamay Pierse and Victoria Poon.  She was a member of the Canadian team that finished 8th in the 4x100-metre freestyle relay and in 7th place in the 4x100-metre medley relay at the 2008 Summer Olympics.  She won the gold medal in 200-metre butterfly at the 2014 Commonwealth Games. and a bronze in the women's 4x100-metre medley relay.  She also swam in the 100-metre butterfly final, finishing seventh with a time of 58.78.

In 2016, she was officially named to Canada's Olympic team for the 2016 Summer Olympics.

See also
 List of Commonwealth Games medallists in swimming (women)
 World record progression 4 × 100 metres medley relay

References

External links
 
 
 
 
 
 

1983 births
Living people
Canadian female butterfly swimmers
Canadian female freestyle swimmers
Canadian female medley swimmers
Commonwealth Games gold medallists for Canada
Commonwealth Games silver medallists for Canada
Commonwealth Games bronze medallists for Canada
World record setters in swimming
Medalists at the FINA World Swimming Championships (25 m)
Olympic swimmers of Canada
Pan American Games gold medalists for Canada
Pan American Games silver medalists for Canada
People from Capitale-Nationale
Sportspeople from Quebec
Swimmers at the 2008 Summer Olympics
Swimmers at the 2012 Summer Olympics
Swimmers at the 2003 Pan American Games
Swimmers at the 2015 Pan American Games
Swimmers at the 2006 Commonwealth Games
Swimmers at the 2010 Commonwealth Games
Swimmers at the 2014 Commonwealth Games
Swimmers at the 2016 Summer Olympics
Commonwealth Games medallists in swimming
Pan American Games medalists in swimming
Universiade medalists in swimming
Universiade gold medalists for Canada
Medalists at the 2007 Summer Universiade
Medalists at the 2003 Pan American Games
Medalists at the 2015 Pan American Games
21st-century Canadian women
Medallists at the 2006 Commonwealth Games
Medallists at the 2010 Commonwealth Games
Medallists at the 2014 Commonwealth Games